HD 74156 c is an extrasolar planet with a minimum mass about eight times that of Jupiter orbiting the star HD 74156. It is most likely a gas giant. This planet was discovered by Dominique Naef and Michel Mayor in April 2001 together with the planet HD 74156 b. In 2022, the inclination and true mass of HD 74156 c were measured via astrometry.

References

Hydra (constellation)
Giant planets
Exoplanets discovered in 2001
Exoplanets detected by radial velocity
Exoplanets detected by astrometry